Brian John Holton (born November 29, 1959) is a former professional baseball player who pitched in the Major Leagues primarily in relief from 1985 to 1990.

Biography
Holton was a member of the Los Angeles Dodgers 1988 World Series winners, notching a save in game 5 of the 1988 National League Championship Series against the New York Mets along the way. He had a 7–3 record with a 1.70 earned run average (ERA) in 45 games during the 1988 regular season. 

He was acquired along with Ken Howell and Juan Bell by the Baltimore Orioles from the Dodgers for Eddie Murray on December 4, 1988.

References

External links
, or Baseball Almanac, or Retrosheet, or Pura Pelota (Venezuelan Winter League)

1959 births
Living people
Sportspeople from McKeesport, Pennsylvania
Albuquerque Dukes players
Baltimore Orioles players
Baseball players from Pennsylvania
Clinton Dodgers players
Lodi Dodgers players
Los Angeles Dodgers players
Louisburg Hurricanes baseball players
Major League Baseball pitchers
Navegantes del Magallanes players
American expatriate baseball players in Venezuela
Rochester Red Wings players
San Antonio Dodgers players